1700 in philosophy

Events 
 Gokulanatha Upadhyaya becomes court pandit to Maharaja Madhave Sinha of Mithila

Births 

 Johann Christoph Gottsched (died 1766)

Publications 

 Thomas Hyde, Historia religionis veterum Persarum, Oxford, 1700.  In this work Hyde highlighted Zoroastrian and Persian philosophies to the West.  He also coined the term dualism (Latin: dualismus) in this work.
 Giovanni Vincenzo Gravina (an early Italian empiricist), De Origine Juris Romani, 1700

References

Bibliography 
 Ganeri, Jonardon, The Lost Age of Reason: Philosophy in Early Modern India 1450-1700, Oxford University Press, 2014 .
 Levitin, Dmitri, Ancient Wisdom in the Age of the New Science: Histories of Philosophy in England, c. 1640–1700, Cambridge University Press, 2015 .
 Pingree, David, Census of the Exact Sciences in Sanskrit, Volume 1, American Philosophical Society, 1970 .
 Ueberweg, Friedrich, History of Philosophy: History of modern philosophy, Scribner, Armstrong & Co, 1876 
 Winston D., "The Iranian component of the Bible, Apocrypha, and Qumran: A Review of the Evidence", History of Religions, vol. 5, no. 2, pp. 183-216.

Philosophy
Early Modern philosophy
Philosophy by year